The Great Mosque of Brussels is located in the Cinquantenaire Park. The original building was built by architect Ernest Van Humbeeck in an Arabic style, to form the Oriental Pavilion of the National Exhibition in Brussels in 1880. At that time the pavilion housed a monumental painting on canvas: “Panorama of Cairo”, by the Belgian painter Emile Wauters, which enjoyed major success. However, lack of maintenance in the twentieth century caused the building to gradually deteriorate.

In 1967, King Baudouin lent the building to King Faisal ibn Abd al-Aziz of Saudi Arabia with a 99-year rent-free lease, on an official visit to Belgium as part of negotiations to secure oil contracts. The building was turned into a place of worship for the use of Muslim immigrants to Belgium, who at the time were notably from Morocco and Turkey. As part of the deal, imams from the Gulf area would be hired, although their orthodox salafism was a tradition, according to Georges Dallemagne, different from that of the more open-minded immigrants but their teachings would over time turn them into a more orthodox tradition and imams would discourage immigrants from integrating into the Belgian society, according to Georges Dallemagne. The mosque, after a long reconstruction carried out at the expense of Saudi Arabia by Tunisian architect Mongi Boubaker, was inaugurated in 1978 in the presence of Khalid ibn Abd al-Aziz and Baudouin.

In the immediate vicinity of the Mosque, the Monument to the Belgian Pioneers in Congo depicts a scene called "Belgian military heroism wipes out the Arab slave trader". Visitors of the Mosque complained about the mention of the "Arab slave trade". Together with the Jordan and Saudi ambassadors, the imam of the Mosque filed a complaint regarding the inscription, leading to the removal of the mention "Arab" in 1988. 

The Mosque's role as the leading religious institution within the Belgian Islamic community—as well as its intended role as a diplomatic bridge between the Saudi and Belgian monarchies—has been a point of debate since its re-foundation. The mosque is popular with Muslim diplomats and is a popular location for Belgians seeking to convert to Islam. It has also taught thousands of Muslim students.

Imams and officials have come out to repeat the message that Islam is a religion of peace and has nothing to do with the terrorists in the aftermath of the November 2015 Paris attacks. The ICC's director Khalid Alabri who propagated the Takfiri dogma was expelled by Belgian authorities for his extreme views in 2012.

In October 2017 the Belgian secretary of state of asylum and migration Theo Francken revoked the residence permit of the Egyptian-trained imam of the mosque, Abdelhadi Sewif. Francken cited his salafist ideology, his conservative stance and the imam being a danger to Belgian society and national security as reasons for the revocation. Sewif denied any connection with extremism and appealed to the country’s highest migration authority, but Belgium’s deputy premier, Jan Jambon, has shot down his chance of a successful appeal. A public commission investigating the 2016 Brussels bombings found that 9 participants of courses at the mosque had joined the ranks of foreign fighters of radical groups in the Middle East. Due to these findings, the commission recommended in October 2017 that Saudi control of the mosque be annulled. The commission also stated that the salafi and wahhabist doctrine of the mosque were antithetical to a liberal Islam compatible with European society.

While the mosque leadership claims to promote an inclusionist vision of Islam, Belgian authorities state that the mosque encourage worshippers to close themselves off from mainstream Belgian society and that lead imam Abdelhadi Sewif spoke neither French nor Dutch, official languages of Belgium.

Organization
By decree signed by Belgian education minister André Bertouille in 1983 the mosque was put under the control of the Muslim World League which then received three positions on its board of directors. The mosque is also financed by the Muslim World League, which in turn is financed by the government of Saudi Arabia. The Islamic Cultural Center hosts a school and an Islamic research centre whose objectives are to propagate the Muslim faith. The prayers are in Arabic. The centre also provides courses of Arabic for adults and children, as well as introductory courses in Islam.

Belgian parliamentarian Willy Demeyer has criticised the mosque’s organisation as outdated: “Today, Muslims are present in every district of Belgium and the vast majority of them wish to live out their beliefs in peace – it is to them that we should be handing over the most representative place of Belgian Islam....”

Saudi Arabia relinquishing control
In February 2018 Saudi Arabia agreed to give up control of the mosque in a sign that it is trying to shed its reputation as a global exporter of an ultra-conservative brand of Islam.

On 16 March 2018, the Council of Ministers of Belgium decided to end the concession and transfer its exploitation to the Muslim Executive of Belgium and a charity of local believers. A transition period of one year was decided, enabling to create a structure that will associate the Muslim Executive and the yet to form association. The government thus enacts a recommendation of the commission investigating the 2016 Brussels bombings that aimed at ending interference of foreign states in the Islam taught in Belgium.

In December 2020, Minister of Justice Vincent Van Quickenborne issued a negative advisory, suspending the procedure for recognition of the new Association de gestion de la grande mosquée de Bruxelles (AGMB) non-profit management association. The State Security Service found three members of the structure linked to Moroccan intelligence and one employed by Turkey's Diyanet. The Académie de Formations et de Recherches en Etudes Islamiques (AFOR) non-profit, created as an independent training centre for imams, had only four students. As of 2018, the nonprofit organization Centre Islamique et Culturel de Belgique, or, in Dutch, Islamitisch en Cultureel Centrum van België, which used to have its seat at the mosque, is being dissolved.

See also
 Cinquantenaire
 Foreign relations of Saudi Arabia
 Islam in Belgium
 Islamic schools and branches
 Islamism
 List of mosques

References

 Wim Robberechts. Brussels: a view from the sky. Davidsfonds, 2004.   p. 84
 Eric Roose. The Architectural Representation of Islam: Muslim-commissioned Mosque Design in the Netherlands. Amsterdam University Press, 2009.  p. 187

External link

Mosques in Belgium
Religious buildings and structures in Brussels
Mosque-related controversies in Europe
Islam and politics
Salafi mosques